Darwen Vale High School is a coeducational secondary school located in Darwen in the English county of Lancashire. The school converted to academy status in 2014 and is part of the Aldridge Education multi-academy trust.

Darwen Vale High School specialises in Dance, STEM and Engineering and work with a number of local businesses including the Lowry and BAES Systems. These specialist areas are reflected in the facilities available in the new Blackburn Road site.

History
The school was established on Union Street, Darwen in 1894 as Darwen Higher Grade School, and was renamed Darwen Secondary School in 1908. In 1929 it became Darwen Grammar School, and relocated to the present site on Blackburn Road in 1938. Following a reorganisation of education in the area in 1972 the school became comprehensive and was renamed Darwen Vale High School.

The school temporarily relocated to the former Darwen Moorland High School site whilst a new build was completed on the Blackburn Road site. The new build was designed by John McAslan, and the original school facade was incorporated into the new build. The school relocated back to the Blackburn Road site in 2012.

Notable former pupils

Darwen Grammar School
Norman Aspin, diplomat.
Alan Walsh, physicist.

Darwen Vale High School
Sue Gibson, Professor of Chemistry at Imperial College London.
Louis Almond, former footballer for Blackpool, Barrow and Tranmere Rovers, currently playing for Ashton United.

References

External links
Darwen Vale High School official website
The Aldridge Foundation
Aldridge Education

Secondary schools in Blackburn with Darwen
Darwen
Educational institutions established in 1894
1894 establishments in England
Academies in Blackburn with Darwen
People educated at Darwen Grammar School
Specialist arts colleges in England
Specialist engineering colleges in England